The North Caucasian bleak (Alburnus hohenackeri) is a species of ray-finned fish in the genus Alburnus. It is found in the western and southwestern Caspian basin in the countries of Armenia, Azerbaijan, Georgia, Iran and the Russian Federation.

References

hohenackeri
Fish described in 1877
Taxa named by Karl Kessler